The 2005 Big South Conference men's basketball tournament took place March 1–5, 2005, at campus sites. The tournament was won by the Winthrop Eagles, their first of what would become four consecutive titles, led by head coach Gregg Marshall. They defeated the #7 Charleston Southern Buccaneers in the championship game 68–46.

Format
The top eight of the conference's nine teams were eligible for the tournament, seeded by conference winning percentage. All games were hosted at campus sites, with home-field advantage going to the higher seed. This gave the #1 seed Winthrop home-court advantage throughout the tournament.

Bracket

* Asterisk indicates overtime game
Source

All-Tournament Team
Torrell Martin, Winthrop
James Shuler, Winthrop
Kurtis Rice, Charleston Southern
Terrell Brown, Charleston Southern
Jakob Sigurdarson, Birmingham–Southern

References

Tournament
Big South Conference men's basketball tournament
Big South Conference men's basketball tournament
Big South Conference men's basketball tournament